Versandhaus Walz GmbH is a mail order company located in Bad Waldsee, Upper Swabia. It was founded by Alfons Walz in 1952. Its main products are fashion, childcare products and homewares. Today the company operates in Germany, Austria, France, the Netherlands, Belgium and Denmark.

Mail-order retailers